Vénérand Bakevyumusaya is a Burundian politician and diplomat. Bakevyumusaya was the foreign minister from 1995–1996, ambassador to France from 1998–2002 and Principal Counselor to the President from 2002–2003. He also served as permanent representative to UNESCO. He was Minister of Regional Integration and East African Community Affairs from November 2007 to January 2009, and is currently (since January 2009) Minister of Information, Communication and Relations with Parliament.

References

Year of birth missing (living people)
Living people
Burundian diplomats
Permanent Delegates of Burundi to UNESCO
Ambassadors of Burundi to France
Government ministers of Burundi
Foreign ministers of Burundi
Communications ministers